Sina Tamaddon was senior vice president of applications for Apple Inc.

Sina Tamaddon joined Apple in September 1997. He also served the company in the position of senior vice president of worldwide service and support, and vice president and general manager of Newton Group. Before joining the company Tamaddon held the position of vice president of Europe with NeXT from September 1996 through March 1997. From August 1994 to August 1996 Tamaddon held the position of vice president of professional services with NeXT.

Prior to August 1994 Tamaddon worked for Software Alliance w Todd Rulon-Miller. Prior to joining Software Alliance, Tamaddon worked for NeXT as the sales manager for their Chicago office. Prior to NeXT, Tamaddon worked for Sun Microsystems.

See also
Outline of Apple Inc. (personnel)
History of Apple Inc.

References

External links

American people of Iranian-Azerbaijani descent
Iranian businesspeople
Living people
1957 births
Apple Inc. employees
Apple Inc. executives
People from Menlo Park, California
People from Tabriz